Evergreen High School is an alternative school in the Yosemite Joint Union High School District in Oakhurst, California.

External links 
School website

High schools in Madera County, California
Public high schools in California
Alternative schools in the United States